Mary-Find-the-Gold (or Mary Find the Gold) is a 1921 British silent drama film directed by George Pearson and starring Betty Balfour, Tom Coventry and Hugh E. Wright.

Cast
 Betty Balfour as Mary Smith 
 Tom Coventry as Tom  
 Hugh E. Wright as Alfred Smith 
 Colin Craig as Jack Bryant  
 Mabel Poulton as Bessie Bryant  
 Arthur Cleave as Arthur Drew  
 Mary Dibley as Miss Reeve  
 Madge Tree as Miss Stag  
 Betty Farquhar as Miss Payne  
 Lilian Braithwaite as Widow Mather  
 Gladys Hamer as Higgs 
 Thomas Weguelin as Wurzel Blake

References

Bibliography
 Low, Rachael. The History of the British Film 1918-1929. George Allen & Unwin, 1971.

External links

1921 films
1921 drama films
British drama films
British silent feature films
1920s English-language films
Films directed by George Pearson
Films set in England
British black-and-white films
1920s British films
Silent drama films